Coniothyrium wernsdorffiae is a plant pathogen that causes brand canker on rose. It can also be hosted by raspberry and brambleberry plants.

References

Fungal plant pathogens and diseases
Rose diseases
Pleosporales
Fungi described in 1871